Presidio of Ahú was a prison in the city of Curitiba, Paraná, Brazil.

It was the first prison in Curitiba, opened in 1905
. Closed in 2006, now is the site of recordings for film and television, such as:
 Estomago;
 400 contra 1;
 O Astro (2011): soap opera of the television produced by Rede Globo de Televisão.

References

Prisons in Brazil
Buildings and structures in Curitiba